Minortrophon is a genus of sea snails, marine gastropod mollusks in the family Muricidae, the murex snails or rock snails.

Species
Species within the genus Minortrophon include:

 Minortrophon crassiliratus (Suter, 1908)
 Minortrophon priestleyi (Hedley, 1916)

References

 
Taxa named by Harold John Finlay